Cupples may refer to:
Anne Cupples (1839–1896), Scottish children's book writer
Claire Cupples, Canadian microbiologist
George Cupples (1822–1891), Scottish maritime novelist
Jimmy Cupples, contestant on the first series of the Australian version of The Voice
Samuel Cupples (1831–1912), American woodenware merchant
L. Adrienne Cupples American epidemiologist